Badger is a surname. Notable people with the surname include:

Clarissa Munger Badger (1806–1889), American botanical artist
Colin R. Badger (1906–1993), Australian adult education administrator
George Edmund Badger (1795–1866), U.S. Senator from North Carolina
George Percy Badger (1815–1888), English Anglican missionary and scholar of oriental studies
Henry Badger (1900–1975), English cricketer
Joseph Badger (ca. 1707–1765), American portrait artist
Len Badger (1945–2021), English footballer for Sheffield United 1962–1976
Luther Badger (1785–1869), US congressman from New York
Owen Badger (1871–1939), Wales national rugby player
Pat Badger (born 1967), American musician
Richard McLean Badger (1896–1974), American spectroscopist
Ruth Badger (born 1978), British reality television contestant and TV presenter
Steve Badger (poker player), American poker player
Steve Badger (swimmer) (born 1956), Australian and later Canadian swimmer
William Badger (1779–1852), American politician, governor of New Hampshire
William Badger (shipbuilder) (1752–1830), American shipbuilder in Kittery, Maine